This is a list of Russian ships of the line from the period 1668–1860:
The format is: Name, number of guns (rank/real amount), launch year (A = built in Arkhangelsk), fate (service = combat service, BU = broken up)

Russian-built battleships

Early Russian Ships of the Line

Oryol 22 guns ("Орёл", launched May 1668, Caspian Sea) – Captured and badly burnt by Razin's rebels 1670, thereafter left to rot. Considered as the first Russian European-type large ship of war and by tradition related to the line-of-battleships.
Mars 30 ("Марс", 1692, training vessel on Lake Pleshcheyevo) – Discarded 1723, burnt 1783

Battleships of the Azov Fleet (1696–1711) of Peter the Great
The first two vessels, while the first major warships of the Sea of Azov fleet (built at Voronezh), were in effect frigates, with their single battery of guns on the upper deck. They were designed for both sailing and rowing, and each had 15 pairs of oarports on the lower deck. They participated in the second Azov campaign (1696) but by 1710 they were derelict.
Apostol Piotr 36 ("Апостол Пётр", April 1696) (sailing & rowing) – Abandoned at Azov to Turkey 1711
Apostol Pavel 36 ("Апостол Павел", April 1696) (sailing & rowing) – Abandoned at Azov to Turkey 1711
Kolokol (Klok – "Колокол", "Клок") 46 (1697) – BU 1710
Liliya 36 ("Лилия", 1699) – BU 1710
Bababan (Trummel – "Барабан", "Трумель") 36 (1699) – BU 1710
Tri Riumki (Drie Rumor – "Три рюмки", "Дри рюмор") 36 (1699) – BU 1710
Stul 36 ("Стул", 1699) – BU 1710
Vesy 36 ("Весы", 1699) – BU 1710
Yiozh (Igel – "Ёж", "Игель") 40 (1700) – BU 1710
6 anonymous 6-gun ships (1699) – Converted to provision vessels 1701, BU 1710
Bezboyazn‘ (Onberfrest, Zondervrees, Sunderban — "Безбоязнь", "Онберфрест", "Сондерфрес", "Сундербан") 38 (1699) – BU 1710
Blagoye Nachalo (Gut Anfangen, Goed Begin, De Segel Begin – "Благое Начало", "Гут-анфанген", "Гут-бегин", "Десегель-бегин") 36 (1699) – BU 1710
Soyedineniye (Unia, Enihkeit – "Соединение", "Уния", "Энихкейт") 30 (1699) – Burnt 1711
Sila (Strakt – "Сила", "Старкт") 36 (1699) – BU 1710
Otvorennuye Vrata (Opon de Poort – "Отворённые врата", "Опон-де-порт") 36 (1699) – BU 1710
Tsvet Voiny (Oorlah Bloem – "Цвет войны", "Орлах блюм") 36 (1699) – BU 1710
Merkurii (Mercurius – "Меркурий", "Меркуриус") 22 (1699) – BU 1716
Lev (Lev s sableyu – "Лев", "Лев с саблею") 44 (1699) – BU after 1710
Yedinorog (Ein horn – "Единорог", "Ейн-горн") 44 (1699) – BU after 1710
Gerkules 52 ("Геркулес", 1699) – BU 1710
Vinogradnaya Vetv‘ (Wijn stok – "Виноградная ветвь", "Вейн-шток") 58 (1702) – BU after 1710
Miach (Bal – "Мяч", "Бал") 54 (1702) – BU after 1710
Krepost‘ (Zamok, Kastel‘, Citadel‘, Stargeit – "Крепость", "Замок", "Кастель", "Ситадель", "Старгейт") 52 (1699) – Sailed to Constantinople in 1699–1700 with ambassador Emelian Ukraintsev who managed the Treaty of Constantinople (1700), delivered to Turkey 1711
Skorpion 52 ("Скорпион", 1699) – Flagship of admiral Fyodor Alexeyevich Golovin during Kerch Expediniton 1699, last mentioned 1700
Flag 52 ("Флаг", 1699) – Burnt 1709
Zvezda (Starn, Zolotaya Zvezda, De Goude Starn – "Звезда", "Штарн", "Золотая Звезда", "Дегоудестарн") 52 (1699) – BU 1709
Dumkracht 44 ("Думкрахт", 1699) – BU 1710
Strus 44 ("Струс", 1699) – BU 1710
Kamen‘ 44 ("Камень", 1699) – BU 1710
Slon (Olifant – "Слон", "Олифант") 44 (1699) – Delivered to Turkey 1711
Rys‘ (Luks – "Рысь", "Лукс") 44 (1699) – BU after 1709
Zhuravl‘ stereguschiy (Kroan opwacht – "Журавль стерегущий", "Кроан опвахт") 44 (1699) – BU after 1709
Sokol (Falk – "Сокол", "Фалк") 44 (1699) – BU after 1709
Sobaka (Treigun – "Собака", "Трейгун") 44 (1699) – BU after 1709
Arfa 36 ("Арфа", 1699) – BU after 1719
Granaat-apol 36 ("Гранат-аполь", 1699) – BU after 1709
anonymous (known as "Italian") 70 – BU on slip 1700

Bozhiye Predvideniye (Goto Predestinatia – "Божие Предвидение", "Гото Предестинация") 58 (1700) – Flagship of vice-admiral Cornelius Cruys during Russo-Turkish War (1710–1711), sold to Turkey 1711
Cherepaha (Schelpot – "Черепаха", "Шхельпот") 58 (1700) – BU 1727
Sviatoi Georgii (Sant Iori – "Святой Георгий", "Сант Иорий") 66 (1701) – Delivered to Turkey 1711
Razzhennoye Zhelezo (Git Ijzer – "Разженное железо", "Гит ейзер") 36 (1701) – BU after 1710
Delfin 62 ("Дельфин", 1703) – BU 1716
Vingelgak 62 ("Винкельгак", 1703) – BU 1716
Voronezh 62 ("Воронеж", 1703) – BU 1710
Samson 70 ("Самсон", 1704) – BU 1710
Staryi Dub (Out Eiketbom – "Старый дуб", "Оут екетбом") 70 (1705) – BU 1727
Aist (Ooievaar – "Аист", "Оифар") 64 (1706) – BU 1727
Spiaschiy Lev (Slav Leeuw – "Спящий лев", "Шлав леу") 70 (1709) – BU 1727
Lastka (Schwal – "Ластка", "Швал") 50 (1709) – Sold to Turkey 1711
Shpaga (Degen – "Шпага", "Деген") 60 (1709) – Destroyed to prevent capture 1711
Sulitsa (Lanz – "Копьё", "Ланц") 60 (1709) – BU 1727
Skorpion 60 ("Скорпион", 1709) – BU 1727
Tsvet Voiny (Oorlah Bloem – "Цвет войны", "Орлах блюм") 60 (1709) – BU 1727
Staryi Oriol (Out Adler – "Старый орёл", "Оут адлер") 82 (1709) – BU 1727
4 anonymous 80-gun ships – BU on slip 1727
7 anonymous 48-gun ships – BU on slip 1727
anonymous 24-gun ship – BU on slip 1727

Battleships of the Baltic Fleet (1703–1860)

Shtandart 28 ("Штандарт", 1703) – Reclassified to 28-gun frigate 1710, BU 1730

Shlissel‘burg-class (7 units)
All built at Olonetskaya Shipyard.
Shlissel‘burg 28/24 ("Шлиссельбург", 1704) – Reclassified to 28-gun frigate 1710, BU after 1710
Kronshlot 28/24 ("Кроншлот", 1704) – Reclassified to 28-gun frigate 1710, BU after 1710
Peterburg 28/24 ("Петербург", 1704) – Reclassified to 28-gun frigate 1710, BU after 1710
Triumf 28/24 ("Триумф", 1704) – Converted to fire-ship 1710
Dorpat 28/24 ("Дерпт", 1704) – Converted to fire-ship 1710
Narva 28/24 ("Нарва", 1704) – Reclassified to 28-gun frigate 1710, BU after 1710
Fligel‘-de-Fam 28/24 ("Флигель-де-Фам", 1704) – Flagship of vice-admiral Cornelius Cruys at the Kronstadt defence 1705 during the Great Northern War, converted to fire-ship 1710

Mikhail Arkhangel-class (2 units)
Both built at Syass'kaya Shipyard
Mikhail Arkhangel 28 ("Михаил Архангел", 1704) – Reclassified to 28-gun frigate 1710, BU after 1710
Ivan-gorod 28 ("Иван-город", 1705) – Reclassified to 28-gun frigate 1710, BU after 1710

Olifant 32 ("Олифант", 1705) – Reclassified to 36-gun frigate 1710, BU 1712
Dumkrakht 32 ("Думкрат", 1707) – Reclassified to 36-gun frigate 1710, BU 1713

Riga-class (4 units)

Riga 50 ("Рига", 1710) – BU 1721
Vyborg 50 ("Выборг", 1710) – Wrecked and burnt to prevent capture 1713
Pernov 50 ("Пернов", 1711) – BU 1721
anonymous 50 (1711) – Wrecked 1712
Poltava 54 ("Полтава", 1712) – BU 1732

Gavriil-class (3 units)
Gavriil 52 ("Гаврил", 1713, A) – BU 1721
Rafail 52 ("Рафаил", 1713, A) – BU 1724
Arkhangel Mikhail 54 ("Архангел Михаил", 1713, A) – BU 1722

Sviataya Ekaterina-class (3 units)
Sviataya Ekaterina 60 ("Святая Екатерина", 1713) – Renamed Vyborg ("Выборг") 1721, converted to praam 1727
Shlissel‘burg 60 ("Шлиссельбург", 1714) – BU after 1736
Narva 60 ("Нарва", 1714) – Lightning 1715 (lost 318 men)

Ingermanland 64 ("Ингерманланд", 1715) – memorial ship 1724, BU after 1739. Ingermanland is a Russian tsar sailing battleship. It marks the beginning of Russia's great plan for ship construction. It was constructed in 1712, launched in 1715 and became the flagship of Peter the Great in the campaigns of 1716 and 1721 during the Great Northern War. It has a 46.02 meter and 12.8 meter wide deck and 5.56 meter hull height.

Uriil-class (4 units)
Uriil 52 ("Уриил", 1715, A) – Sold for BU in Amsterdam 1722
Varakhail 52 ("Варахаил", 1715, A) – BU 1724
Selafail 52 ("Селафаил", 1715, A) – BU 1724
Yagudiil 52 ("Ягудиил", 1715, A) – Sold for BU in Amsterdam 1722

Sviatoi Aleksandr 70/76 ("Святой Александр", 1717) – Flagship of admiral Zakhar Mishukov at Russo-Swedish War (1741–1743) in 1742, BU after 1746
Revel‘ 68 ("Ревель", 1717) – BU 1732
Neptunus 70/78 ("Нептунус", 1718) – BU 1732
Lesnoye 90 ("Лесное", 1718) – Damaged at the storm and BU 1741
Gangut 90/92 ("Гангут", 1719) – BU 1736

Isaak-Viktoriya-class (2 units)
Isaak-Viktoriya 66 ("Исаак-Виктория", 1719) – BU after 1739
Astrakhan‘ 66 ("Астрахань", 1720) – BU 1736

Nord-Adler-class (2 units)
Nord-Adler 80/88 ("Норд-Адлер", 1720) – BU after 1740
Sviatoi Andrei 80/88 ("Святой Андрей", 1721) – BU after 1740

Friedrichstadt 90/96 ("Фридрихштадт", 1720) – BU 1736
Sviatoi Piotr 80/88 ("Святой Пётр", 1720) – BU 1736
Fridemaker 80/88 ("Фридемакер", 1721) – BU 1736
Sviataya Ekaterina 66/70 ("Святая Екатерина", 1721) – BU 1736
Panteleimon-Viktoriya 66 ("Пантелеймон-Виктория", 1721) – BU 1736

Sankt-Mikhail-class (4 units)
All four built at St Petersburg.
Sankt-Mikhail 54 ("Санкт-Михаил", 1723) – BU after 1739
Rafail 54 ("Рафаил", 1724) – BU after 1739
Ne Tron‘ Menia (also Noli me tangere – "Не тронь меня") 54 (1725) – BU after 1739
Riga 54 ("Рига", 1729) – Converted to hospital ship 1746

Derbent 64/66 ("Дербент", 1724) – BU after 1739
Narva 64/66 ("Нарва", 1725) – BU after 1739
Sviataya Natal'ya 66 ("Святая Наталья", 1727) – BU 1739
Piotr I i II 100 ("Пётр I и II", 1727) – Flagship of Russian admiral Thomas Gordon during the Siege of Danzig (1734), BU 1752

Piotr II-class (19 units)

Piotr II 54 ("Пётр II", 1728) – BU after 1739
Vyborg 54 ("Выборг", 1729) – BU after 1739
Novaya Nadezhda 54 ("Новая Надежда", 1730) – BU 1747
Gorod Arkhangel‘sk 54 ("Город Архангельск", 1735, A) – BU 1749
Severnaya Zvezda 54 ("Северная Звезда", 1735, A) – BU 1749
Neptunus 54 ("Нептунус", 1736, A) – BU after 1750
Azov 54 ("Азов", 1736) – BU 1752
Astrakhan‘ 54 ("Астрахань", 1736) – BU 1752
Sviatoi Andrei 54 ("Святой Андрей", 1737, A) – VU after 1752
Kronshtadt 54 ("Кронштадт", 1738, A) – BU 1755
Sviatoi Panteleimon 54 ("Святой Пантелеймон", 1740) – BU 1756
Sviatoi Isaakii 54 ("Святой Исаакий", 1740, A) – BU 1756
Sviatoi Nikolai 54 ("Святой Николай", 1748, A) – Renamed Sviatoy Nikolay vtotoy ("Святой Николай второй") 1754, BU after 1762
Varakhiil 54 ("Варахиил", 1749, A) – Wrecked 1749
Shlissel‘burg 54 ("Шлиссельбург", 1752, A) – BU 1765
Varakhiil 54 ("Варахиил", 1752, A) – BU 1763
Neptunus 54 ("Нептунус", 1758, A) – Discarded 1771
Gorod Arkhangel‘sk 54 ("Город Архангельск", 1761, A) – BU after 1774
Aziya 54 ("Азия", 1768, A) – Lost in Aegean Sea 1773 (lost 439 men)

Slava Rossii-class (59 units)
Slava Rossii 66 ("Слава России", 1733) – BU 1752
Severnyi Oryol 66 ("Северный Орёл", 1735) – BU 1763
Revel‘ 66 ("Ревель", 1735) – BU 1752
Ingermanland 66 ("Ингерманланд", 1735) – BU 1752
Osnovaniye Blagopoluchiya 66 ("Основание Благополучия", 1736) – BU 1752
Leferm 66 ("Леферм", 1739, A) – BU 1756
Schastiye 66 ("Счастие") (ex-Generalissimus Rossiyskiy ("Генералиссимус Российский") – renamed on slip) (1741, A) – BU 1756
Blagopoluchiye 66 ("Благополучие") (ex-Pravitel'nitsa Rossiyskaya ("Правительница Российская") – renamed on slip) (1741, A) – Converted to harbour lighter 1744, BU 1748
Sviatoi Piotr 66 ("Святой Пётр") (ex-Ioann ("Иоанн")- renamed on slip) (1741) – Flagship of admiral count Nikolai Golovin at Russo-Swedish War (1741–1743) in 1743, BU 1756
Sviataia Ekaterina 66 ("Святая Екатерина", 1742, A) – BU 1756
Fridemaker 66 ("Фридемакер", 1742, A) – BU 1756
Lesnoi 66 ("Лесной", 1743, A) – BU 1759
Poltava 66 ("Полтава", 1743, A) – BU 1756
Arkhangel Rafail 66 ("Архангел Рафаил", 1744, A) – BU 1758
Sviataya Velokomuchenitsa Varvara 66 ("Святая Великомученица Варвара", 1745) – BU 1755
Sviatoi Sergii 66 ("Святой Сергий", 1747, A) – BU 1763
Sviatoi Aleksandr Nevskii 66 ("Святой Александр Невский", 1749) – BU 1763
Ioann Zlatoust 66 ("Иоанн Златоуст", 1740) – Renamed Ioann Zlatoust vtoroy ("Иоанн Златоуст второй") 1751, BU 1759
Arkhangel Gavriil 66 ("Архангел Гавриил", 1749, A) – BU 1763
Arkhangel Uriil 66 ("Архангел Уриил", 1749, A) – BU 1763
Moskva 66 ("Москва", 1750, A) – Wrecked 1758, found by divers 1893
Ingermanland 66 ("Ингерманланд", 1752, A) – BU 1765
Nataliya 66 ("Наталия", 1754, A) – BU 1771
Poltava 66 ("Полтава", 1754, A) – Sank in harbour from leak 1770
Astrakhan 66 ("Астрахань", 1756, A) – Wrecked 1760
Revel‘ 66 ("Ревель", 1756, A) – BU 1771
Rafail 66 ("Рафаил", 1758, A) – BU 1771
anonymous 66 (1758, A) – Wrecked 1758 before she could be named
Moskva 66 ("Москва", 1760, A) – BU 1771
Sviatoi Piotr 66("Святой Пётр", 1760, A) – Burnt 1764
Sviatoi Iakov 66 ("Святой Иаков", 1761, A) – BU 1774
Sviatoi Aleksandr Nevskiy 66 ("Святой Александр Невский", 1762, A) – Burnt 1764
Ne Tron‘ Menia 66 ("Не тронь меня", 1763, A) – Converted to frigate 1772, sold for BU in Livorno 1775
Severnyi Oryol 66 ("Северный Орёл", 1763, A) – Sold for BU in England 1770
Sviatoi Evstafii Plakida 66 ("Святой Евстафий Плакида", 1763) – Was the flagship (2nd flag) and blew up at the Battle of Chesma (1770)
Sviatoi Ianuarii 66 ("Святой Иануарий", 1763) – Sold for BU in Naousa 1775
Saratov 66 ("Саратов", 1765, A) – BU 1786
Tver‘ 66 ("Тверь", 1765, A) – BU after 1776
Triokh Ierarkhov 66 ("Трёх Иерархов", 1766) – Flagship of General-in-Chief count Alexei Orlov at the Battle of Chesma (1770), discarded 1786
Triokh Sviatitelei 66 ("Трёх Святителей", 1766) – Sold for BU in Naousa 1775
Evropa 66 ("Европа", 1768, A) – BU after 1791
Vsevolod 66 ("Всеволод", 1769, A) – Burnt 1779
Rostislav 66 ("Ростислав", 1769, A) – BU 1782
Sviatoi Georgii Pobedonosets 66 ("Святой Георгий Победоносец", 1770) – BU 1780
Graf Orlov 66 ("Граф Орлов", 1770, A) – BU 1791
Pamiat‘ Evstafiya 66 ("Память Евстафия", 1770, A) – BU 1791
Pobeda 66 ("Победа", 1770, A) – BU 1780
Viktor 66 ("Виктор", 1771, A) – BU 1791
Viacheslav 66 ("Вячеслав", 1771, A) – BU after 1784
Dmitrii Donskoi 66 ("Дмитрий Донской", 1771, A) – BU 1791
Mironosits (also Sviatykh Zhion Mironosits — "Мироносиц" or "Святых жён мироносиц") 66 (1771) – BU 1791
Svyatoi Kniaz‘ Vladimir 66 ("Святой Князь Владимир", 1771) – BU after 1791
Aleksandr Nevskii 66 ("Александр Невский", 1772, A) – BU 1784
Boris i Gleb 66 ("Борис и Глеб", 1772, A) – Damaged in collision 1778, BU 1789
Preslava 66 ("Преслава", 1772, A) – BU 1791
Deris‘ 66 ("Дерись", 1772, A) – BU 1791
Ingermanlandiya 66 ("Ингерманландия", 1773, A) – BU 1784
Spiridon 66 ("Спиридон", 1779) – BU 1791
David Selunskii 66 ("Давид Селунский", 1779) – BU after 1786

Imperatritsa Anna 110/114 ("Императрица Анна", 1737) – BU 1752

Sviatoi Pavel-class (10 units)
Sviatoi Pavel 80 ("Святой Павел", 1743) – BU 1756
Ioann Zlatoust pervyi 80 ("Иоанн Златоуст первый", 1751) – BU 1769
Sviatoi Nikolai 80 ("Святой Николай", 1754) – Flagship of admiral Zakhar Mishukov in 1758 during the Seven Years' War, BU 1769
Sviatoi Pavel 80 ("Святой Павел", 1755) – Flagship of admiral Zakhar Mishukov in 1757 during the Seven Years' War, BU 1769
Sviatoi Andrei Pervozvannyi 80 ("Святой Андрей Первозванный", 1758) – BU 1785
Sviatoi Kliment Papa Rimskii 80 ("Святой Климент Папа Римский", 1758) – Flagship of admiral Andrey Polianskiy in 1760 during the Seven Years' War, BU 1780
Kir Ioann ("Кир Иоанн") (ex-Friedrich Rex ("Фридрих Карл") – renamed on slip) 80 (1762) – Discarded after 1769
Sviataya Ekaterina ("Святая Екатерина") (ex-Prinz Georg ("Принц Георг") – renamed on slip) 80 (1762) – Discarded after 1769
Sviatoslav 80 ("Святослав", 1769) – Cut down as 2-decker 72-gun battleship in England 1769, flagship (3rd flag) at the Battle of Chesma (1770), wrecked and scuttled to prevent capture 1770
Ches‘ma (also Sviatoi Ioann Krestitel‘ – "Чесьма" or "Святой Иоанн Креститель") 80 (1770) – BU 1781

Zakharii i Elisavet 100 ("Захарий и Елисавет", 1748) – BU 1759
Sviatoi Dmitrii Rostovskii 100 ("Святой Дмитрий Ростовский", 1758) – Flagship of admiral Zakhar Mishukov in 1760 during the Seven Years' War, BU 1772

Sviatoi Velikomuchenik Isidor-class (2 units)
Sviatoi Velikomuchenik Isidor 74 ("Святой Великомученик Исидор") (ex-Chesma ("Чесма") – renamed on slip) (1772) – BU 1784
Sviatoi Velikomuchenik Panteleimon 74 ("Святой Великомученик Пантелеймон", 1772) – BU 1784
Iezikil‘ 78 ("Иезикиль", 1773) – BU after 1797

Azia-class (28 units)
Aziya 66 ("Азия", 1773, A) – BU after 1791
Amerika 66 ("Америка", 1773, A) – BU after 1791
Slava Rossii 66 ("Слава России", 1774, A) – Wrecked near Toulon 1780
Blagopoluchiye 66 ("Благополучие", 1774, A) – BU 1793
Tviordyi 66 ("Твёрдый", 1774, A) – BU 1791
Sviatoi Nikolai 66 ("Святой Николай", 1775, A) – BU 1790
Khrabryi 66 ("Храбрый", 1775, A) – BU 1793
Sviatoi Ianuarii 66 ("Святой Иануарий", 1780, A) – BU 1815
Ne Tron‘ Menia 66 ("Не тронь меня", 1780, A) – Hulked 1803
Pobedonosets 66 ("Победоносец", 1780) – BU 1807
Sviatoslav 66 ("Святослав", 1781, A) – BU after 1800
Triokh Sviatitelei 66 ("Трёх Святителей", 1781, A) – BU 1801
Vysheslav 66 ("Вышеслав", 1782, A) – Wrecked and burnt to prevent capture 1789
Rodislav 66 ("Родислав", 1782, A) – Wrecked 1789
Boleslav 66 ("Болеслав", 1783, A) – BU 1808
Mecheslav 66 ("Мечеслав", 1783, A) – BU after 1794
Panteleimon 66 ("Пантелеймон", 1786, A) – BU after 1804
Severnyi Oriol 66 ("Северный Орёл", 1787, A) – Wrecked and destroyed to prevent capture 1789
Prokhor 66 ("Прохор", 1788, A) – BU after 1795
Parmen 66 ("Пармен", 1789, A) – BU 1799
Nikanor 66 ("Никанор", 1789, A) – Last mentioned 1796
Pimen 66 ("Пимен", 1789, A) – BU 1799
Iona 66 ("Иона", 1790, A) – BU 1803
Filipp 66 ("Филипп", 1790, A) – BU 1803
Graf Orlov 66 ("Граф Орлов", 1791, A) – Renamed Mikhail ("Михаил") 1796, BU 1809
Evropa 66 ("Европа", 1793, A) – BU 1811
Aziya 66 ("Азия", 1796, A) – Transferred to the Black Sea Fleet 1801, sold to France in Trieste 1809
Pobeda 66 ("Победа", 1797, A) – Transferred to the Black Sea Fleet 1801, BU after 1816

Isiaslav 66 ("Изяслав", 1784, A) – an experimental design by Adm. Greig; converted to 74-gun ship in 1800, BU 1808

Tsar' Konstantin-class (4 units)
Tsar‘ Konstantin 74 ("Царь Константин", 1779) – Discarded after 1797
Pobedoslav 74 (also Simon Srodnik Gospodnia – "Победослав" or "Симон Сродник Господня") (1782) – BU 1804
Sviataya Elena 74 ("Святая Елена", 1785) – Interned by Britain 1808, released and sold to Britain 1813
Aleksandr Nevskii 74 ("Александр Невский", 1787, A) – Converted to floating craine 1804, BU 1814

Ioann Bogoslov 74 ("Иоанн Богослов", 1783) – BU 1791

Chesma-class (9 units)

Ches‘ma (also Ioann Krestitel‘ – "Чесьма" or "Иоанн Креститель") 100 (1783) – Flagship of admiral Andrei Kruz at the Kronstadt Battle (1790), BU 1806
Triokh Ierarkhov 100 ("Трёх Иерархов", 1783) – Discarded after 1796
Rostislav 100 ("Ростислав", 1784) – Flagship of admiral Samuil Greig at the Battle of Hogland (1788), flagship of admiral Vasili Chichagov at the  Battle of Öland (1789), Battle of Reval (1790) and Battle of Vyborg Bay (1790), BU after 1805
Saratov 100 ("Саратов", 1785) – Hulked as hospital ship 1804
Dvu-na-desiat‘ Apostolov 100 ("Дву-на-десять Апостолов", 1788) – BU 1802
Sviatoi Ravno-apostol‘nyi Kniaz‘ Vladimir 100 ("Святой Равно-апостольный князь Владимир", 1788) – BU 1802
Sviatoi Nikolai Chudotvorets 100 ("Святой Николай Чудотворец", 1789) – BU 1807
Evsevii 100 ("Евсевий", 1790) – BU 1803
anonymous 100 – BU on slip 1798

Yaroslav-class (19 units)

Yaroslav 74 ("Ярослав", 1784, A) – BU 1798
Vladislav 74 ("Владислав", 1784, A) – Captured by Sweden after the Battle of Hogland (1788), renamed HMS Vladislaff, discarded 1819
Vseslav 74 ("Всеслав", 1785, A) – BU 1798
Mstislav 74 ("Мстислав", 1785, A) – BU 1811
Kir Ioann 74 ("Кир Иоанн", 1785, A) – BU 1798
Sviatoi Piotr 74 ("Святой Пётр", 1786, A) – BU 1803
Sysoi Velikii 74 ("Сысой Великий", 1788, A) – BU 1804
Maksim Ispovednik 74 ("Максим Исповедник", 1788, A) – BU 1804
Boris 74 ("Борис", 1789, A) – Hulked as depot 1802
Gleb 74 ("Глеб", 1789, A) – Converted to hospital ship 1805
Aleksei 74 ("Алексей", 1790, A) – Hulked 1808, BU 1815
Piotr 74 ("Пётр", 1790, A) – BU 1821
Pamiat‘ Evstafiya 74 ("Память Евстафия", 1791, A) – BU 1817
Isidor 74 ("Исидор", 1795, A) – Transferred to the Black Sea Fleet 1801, BU 1812
Vsevolod 74 ("Всеволод", 1796, A) – Destroyed in the action near Baltiyskiy Port (1808) during the Anglo-Russian War (1807–1812)
Severnyi Oriol 74 ("Северный Орёл", 1797, A) – BU 1809
Moskva 74 ("Москва", 1799, A) – Sold to France in Toulon 1809
Yaroslav 74 ("Ярослав", 1799, A) – Interned by Britain 1808, released and sold to Britain 1813
Sviatoi Piotr 74 ("Святой Пётр", 1799, A) – Sold to France in Toulon 1809
Elisaveta 74 ("Елисавета", 1795) – BU 1817
Blagodat‘ 130 ("Благодать", 1800) – Flagship of admiral Pyotr Khanykov in 1808 during the Anglo-Russian War (1807–1812), BU 1814
Rafail 80/82 ("Рафаил", 1800) – Interned by Britain 1808 and non released
Zachatiye Sviatoi Anny 74 ("Зачатие Святой Анны", 1800) – BU 1810
Arkhistratig Mikhail 72/64 ("Архистратиг Михаил", 1800) – Converted to transport vessel 1813, BU 1817
Gavriil 100 ("Гавриил", 1802) – BU 1819
Uriil 80 ("Уриил", 1802) – Sold to France in Trieste 1809

Selafail-class (23 units)

Selafail 74 ("Селафаил", 1803) – Flagship of vice-admiral Dmitry Senyavin during the Adriatic Sea Campaign (1806), interned by Britain 1808, released and sold to Britain 1813
Sil‘nyi 74 ("Сильный", 1804, A) – Interned by Britain 1808, released 1813, BU 1819
Oriol 74 ("Орёл", 1807, A) – BU 1833
Severnaya Zvezda 74 ("Северная Звезда", 1807, A) – Damaged during flood in Kronstadt (1824), BU 1827
Borei 74 ("Борей", 1807, A) – Damaged during flood in Kronstadt (1824), BU 1829
Ne Tron‘ Menia 74 ("Не тронь меня", 1809, A) – Damaged during flood in Kronstadt (1824), BU 1828
Triokh Ierarkhov 74 ("Трёх Иерархов", 1809, A) – Damaged during flood in Kronstadt (1824), hulked as depot 1827
Sviatoslav 74 ("Святослав", 1809, A) – Damaged during flood in Kronstadt (1824), BU 1828
Nord-Adler 74 ("Норд-Адлер", 1811, A) – Sold to Spain 1818, renamed España, stricken 1821
Prints Gustav 74 ("Принц Густав", 1811, A) – Damaged during flood in Kronstadt (1824), BU 1827
Berlin 74 ("Берлин", 1813, A) – Hulked as depot 1827
Gamburg 74 ("Гамбург", 1813, A) – Damaged during flood in Kronstadt (1824), hulked as depot 1827
Drezden 74 ("Дрезден", 1813, A) – Sold to Spain 1818, renamed Alejandro I, stricken 1823
Liubek 74 ("Любек", 1813, A) – Sold to Spain 1818, renamed Numancia I, BU 1823
Arsis 74 ("Арсис", 1816, A) – Damaged during flood in Kronstadt (1824), hulked as depot 1828
Katsbakh 74 ("Кацбах", 1816, A) – Damaged during flood in Kronstadt (1824), hulked 1828
Retvizan 74 ("Ретвизан", 1818, A) – BU 1833
Triokh Sviatitelei 74 ("Трёх Святителей", 1819, A) – Damaged during flood in Kronstadt (1824), BU 1828
Sviatoi Andrei 74 ("Святой Андрей", 1821, A) – Sunk as target vessel by admiral Karl Sсhilder's submarine 1840
Sysoi Velikii 74 ("Сысой Великий", 1822, A) – BU 1837
Prokhor 74 ("Прохор", 1823, A) – BU 1846
Kniaz‘ Vladimir 74 ("Князь Владимир", 1824, A) – Hulked 1831
Tsar‘ Konstantin 74 ("Царь Константин", 1825, A) – BU 1831

Moschnyi 66 ("Мощный", 1805, A) – Interned by Britain 1808, released 1813, BU 1817
Skoryi 66 ("Скорый", 1805) – Interned by Britain 1808, released and sold to Britain 1813
Tviordyi 74 ("Твёрдый", 1805) – Flagship of vice-admiral Dmitry Senyavin at the Battle of the Dardanelles (1807) and Battle of Athos (1807), interned by Britain 1808, released and sold to Britain 1813
Khrabryi 120 ("Храбрый", 1808) – Damaged during flood in Kronstadt (1824), BU 1829
Smelyi 88 ("Смелый", 1808) – BU 1819
Pobedonosets 64 ("Победоносец", 1809, A) – Hulked 1822

Vsevolod-class (2 units)

Vsevolod 66 ("Всеволод", 1809, A) – Hulked 1820
Saratov 66 ("Саратов", 1809, A) – Wrecked 1812

Pamiat' Evstafiya-class (2 units)

Pamiat‘ Evstafiya 74 ("Память Евстафия", 1810) – BU 1828
Chesma 74 ("Чесма", 1811) – BU 1828

Trekh Sviatitelei-class (7 units)

Triokh Sviatitelei 74 ("Трёх Святителей", 1810) – Sold to Spain 1818, renamed Velasco, stricken 1821
Mironisits 74 ("Мироносиц", 1811) – BU 1825
Yupiter 74 ("Юпитер", 1812) – Damaged during flood in Kronstadt (1824), BU 1828
Neptunus 74 ("Нептунус", 1813) – Sold to Spain 1818, renamed Fernando VII, stricken 1823
Piotr 74 ("Пётр", 1814) – BU 1828
Finland 74 ("Финланд", 1814) – Damaged during flood in Kronstadt (1824), BU 1828
Fershampenuaz 74 ("Фершампенуаз", 1817) – Flagship of rear admiral Pyotr Rikord during the Civil conflict in Greece (1831), burnt 1831

Rostislav 110 ("Ростислав", 1813) – BU 1827

Leipzig-class (2 units)

Leipzig 110 ("Лейпциг", 1816) – Damaged during flood in Kronstadt (1824), hulked as depot 1825, BU 1832
Tviordyi 110 ("Твёрдый", 1819) – Damaged during flood in Kronstadt (1824), BU 1828

Emgeiten 84 ("Эмгейтен", 1820) – Renamed Kronshtadt ("Кронштадт") 1829, hulked 1835
Emmanuil 84 ("Эммануил", 1824) – Sold to Greece 1830, BU 1832-33
Gangut 84 ("Гангут", 1825) – Converted to screw 1854, training ship 1862, decommissioned 1871

Iezekiil‘-class (25 units)

Iezekiil‘ 80 ("Иезекииль", 1826, A) – Hulked 1842, BU 1849
Azov 74 ("Азов", 1826, A) – Russian flagship of admiral Login Geiden at the Battle of Navarino (1827) and during Russo-Turkish War (1828–1829) in Aegean Sea, BU 1831
Aleksandr Nevskii 74 ("Александр Невский", 1826) – Cut down as 64-gun frigate 1832, hulked as depot 1846, BU 1847
Velikii Kniaz‘ Mikhail 86 ("Великий Князь Михаил", 1827) – Converted to floating crane 1860, decommissioned 1863
Katsbach 80 ("Кацбах", 1828, A) – BU 1857
Kul‘m 90 ("Кульм", 1828, A) – BU 1857
Arsis 80 ("Арсис", 1828) – Hulked 1854
Lesnoye 80 ("Лесное", 1829, A) – Hulked as depot 1842
Narva 80 ("Нарва", 1829, A) – Hulked 1844
Brien 80 ("Бриен", 1829) – Decommissioned 1860
Borodino 80 ("Бородино", 1830, A) – Hulked 1847
Krasnoi 80 ("Красной", 1830, A) – Hulked 1844
Berezino 80 ("Березино"", 1830) – BU 1860
Smolensk 80 ("Смоленск", 1830) – Hulked as depot 1856
Pamiat‘ Azova 86 ("Память Азова", 1831, A) – Hulked 1848, BU 1854
Oriol 80 ("Орёл", 1833, A) – Hulked 1848
Ostrolenka 80 ("Остроленка", 1834, A) – Hulked 1848
Leipzig 80 ("Лейпциг", 1836, A) – Hulked 1850
Retvizan 80 ("Ретвизан", 1839, A) – Hulked 1852
Finland 80 ("Финланд", 1840, A) – BU 1857
Ingermanland 74 ("Ингерманланд", 1842, A) – Wrecked 1842 (lost 329 men, women and children)
Ingermanland ("Ингерманланд") (ex-Iezekil‘ ("Иезекиль") – renamed on slip) 74 (1844, A) – Decommissioned 1860
Narva ("Нарва") (ex-Sviatoslav ("Святослав") – renamed on slip) 74 (1846, A) – Cut down as 58-gun frigate 1855, decommissioned 1863
Pamiat‘ Azova 74 ("Память Азова", 1848, A) – Decommissioned 1863
Sysoi Velikiy 74 ("Сысой Великий", 1849, A) – Cut down as 58-gun frigate 1855, decommissioned 1863

Imperator Aleksandr-class (3 units)

Imperator Aleksandr 110 ("Император Александр", 1827) – BU 1854
Imperator Piotr I 110 ("Император Пётр I", 1829) – Decommissioned 1863
Sviatoi Georgii Pobedonosets 110 ("Святой Георгий Победоносец", 1829) – BU 1858

Imperatritsa Aleksandra-class (8 units)

Imperatritsa Aleksandra 84/96 ("Императрица Александра", 1827) – Decommissioned 1863
Emgeiten 84/94 ("Эмгейтен", 1828) – BU 1858
Poltava 84/90 ("Полтава", 1829) – Decommissioned 1860
Ne Tron' Menia 84/92 ("Не тронь меня", 1832) – Decommissioned 1863
Vladimir 84/92 ("Владимир", 1833) – Converted to floating crane 1860
 84/94 ("Лефорт", 1835) – Wrecked 1857 (826 men, women and children lost)
 84/92 ("Вола", 1837) – Converted to screw 1856, later become training ship, stricken 1871
Andrei 84/92 ("Андрей", 1844) – Hulked as floating barracks 1857, decommissioned 1861

Fershampenuaz-class (3 units)

Fershampenuaz 74/82 ("Фершампенуаз", 1833) – Decommissioned 1860
Konstantin 74/82 ("Константин", 1837) – Converted to screw 1854, decommissioned 1864
Vyborg 74/82 ("Выборг", 1841) – Converted to screw 1854, decommissioned 1863

Rossiya 120/128 ("Россия", 1839) – Hulked as floating barracks 1857, BU 1860
Krasnoi 84 ("Красной", 1847) – Decommissioned 1863
Iezekiil‘ 74 ("Иезекииль", 1847, A) – Hulked 1860, decommissioned 1863
Prokhor 84 ("Прохор", 1851) – Artillery training ship 1858, decommissioned 1863
Oriol 84 ("Орёл", 1854) (completed as screw) – Decommissioned in 1863
Retvisan 84 ("Ретвизан", 1855) (completed as screw) – Converted to sail 1863, to target vessel 1874, decommissioned 1880

Borodino-class (2 units)

Borodino 74 ("Бородино", 1850, A) – Cut down as 58-gun frigate 1855, decommissioned 1863
Vilagosh 74 ("Вилагош", 1851, A) – Cut down as 58-gun frigate 1855, decommissioned 1863

Imperator Nikolai I 111/109 ("Император Николай I", 1860) (screw) – Decommissioned 1874

Battleships of the Azov Flotilla (1770–83) of Catherine the Great

"New-invented" Type I (1 unit)

All eight "new-invented" ("новоизобретённый") units were flat-bottomed, two-mast (except Khotin), one-deck ships. Built in middle stream of Don River. Designed capable to sail downstream and to overpass river's sand-bar.
Khotin 16 ("Хотин", 1770) – Flagship of vice-admiral Alexei Senyavin during the Russo-Turkish War (1768–1774), transferred to the Black Sea Fleet 1783, BU after 1787

"New-invented" Type II (7 units)

Azov 16 ("Азов", 1770) – Transferred to the Black Sea Fleet 1783, BU after 1784
Modon 16 ("Модон", 1770) – Transferred to the Black Sea Fleet 1783, BU after 1783
Taganrog 16 ("Таганрог", 1770) – Wrecked 1782
Moreya 16 ("Морея", 1770) – BU after 1774
Novopavlovsk 16 ("Новопавловск", 1770) – BU after 1774
Koron 16 ("Корон", 1770) – Wrecked 1782
Zhurzha 16 ("Журжа", 1770) – Transferred to the Black Sea Fleet 1783, BU after 1784

Battleships of the Black Sea Fleet (1783–1855)
Ekaterina 60 ("Екатерина") – BU on slip 1785

Slava Ekateriny-class (6 units)

Slava Ekateriny 66 ("Слава Екатерины") 1783) – Renamed Preobrazheniye Gospodne ("Преображение Господне") 1788, flagship of rear admiral count Mark Voynovich at the Battle of Fidonisi (1788), BU after 1791
Sviatoi Pavel 66 ("Святой Павел", 1784) – BU after 1794
Mariya Magdalina 66 ("Мария Магдалина", 1785) – Heavily damaged at the storm and captured by Turkey near Bosporus 1787
Aleksandr 66 ("Александр", 1786) – Wrecked 1786
Vladimir 66 ("Владимир", 1787) – BU after 1804
Iosif II 80 ("Иосиф II", 1787) – Renamed Rozhdestvo Christovo ("Рождество Христово")1790, flagship of rear admiral Fyodor Ushakov at the Battle of Kerch Strait (1790), Battle of Tendra (1790), and Battle of Cape Kaliakra (1791), BU 1800

Sviatoi Georgii Pobedonostes 50/54 ("Святой Георгий Победоносец") 1785) – Reclassified to 50-gun frigate 1793, BU after 1800

Apostol Andrei-class (2 units)

Apostol Andrei 50 ("Апостол Андрей") 1786) – Reclassified to 50-gun frigate 1793, converted to floating crane 1800
Aleksandr Nevskii 50 ("Александр Невский", 1787) – Reclassified to 50-gun frigate 1793, discarded after 1799

Piotr Apostol-class (6 units)

Piotr Apostol 50/46 ("Пётр Апостол", 1788) – Reclassified to 44-gun frigate 1793, BU after 1799
Ioann Bogoslov 50/46 ("Иоанн Богослов", 1788) – Reclassified to 44-gun frigate 1793, burnt 1794
Tsar‘ Konstantin 50/46 ("Царь Константин", 1789) – Reclassified to 44-gun frigate 1793, wrecked 1799 (399 men lost including rear admiral I. T. Ovtsyn)
Fiodor Stratilat 50/46 ("Фёдор Стартилат", 1790) – Reclassified to 44-gun frigate 1793, wrecked 1799 (268 men lost)
Soshestviye Sviatogo Dukha ("Сошествие Святого Духа") (ex-Sviataya Troitsa ("Святая Троица") – renamed on slip) 50/46 (1791) -Reclassified to 44-gun frigate 1793, discarded after 1802
Kazanskaya Bogoroditsa 50/46 ("Казанская Богородица", 1791) – Reclassified to 44-gun frigate 1793, discarded after 1802

Maria Magdalina pervaya 66 ("Мария Магдалина первая", 1789) – BU 1803
Navarkhia (also Vozneseniye Gospodne — "Навархия" or "Вознесение Господне") 50/46 – Reclassified to 50-gun frigate 1793, discarded after 1802
Sviatoi Nikolai 50/44 ("Святой Николай", 1790) – Reclassified to 44-gun frigate 1793, sold for BU in Naples 1802
Bogoyavleniye Gospodne 66/72 ("Богоявление Господне", 1791) – BU 1804
Sviataya Troitsa 66/72 ("Святая Троица") (ex-Soshestviye Sviatogo Dukha ("Сошествие Святого Духа") – renamed on slip) (1791) – BU after 1806
Sviatoi Pavel 90/84/82 ("Святой Павел", 1794) – Flagship of admiral Fyodor Ushakov in Mediterranean Campaign (1798–1800) and Corfu assault (1799), BU 1810

Sviatoi Piotr-class (7 units)

Sviatoi Piotr 74 ("Святой Пётр", 1794) – Hulked as depot 1803
Zakharii i Elizavet 74 ("Захарий и Елизавет", 1795) – Hulked as depot 1803
Simeon i Anna 74 ("Симеон и Анна", 1797) – Discarded after 1804
Sviatoi Mikhail 74 ("Святой Михаил", 1798) – Hulked as hospital ship 1807, sold for BU in Corfu 1807
Maria Magdalina vtoraya 74 ("Мария Магдалина вторая", 1799) – BU after 1810
Tol‘skaya Bogoroditsa 74 ("Тольская Богородица", 1799) – Wrecked 1804 (164 men lost)
Sviataya Paraskeva 74 ("Святая Параскева", 1799) – Sold to France in Trieste 1809

Yagudiil 110 ("Ягудиил", 1800) – BU 1812
Varakhiil 68 ("Варахиил", 1800) – BU 1813
Ratnyi 110 ("Ратный", 1802) – Flagship of rear admiral Semyon Pustoshkin in 1807 during Russo-Turkish War (1806–1812), BU after 1825
Pravyi 74/76 ("Правый", 1804) – Discarded after 1813

Anapa-class (11 units)

Anapa 74 ("Анапа", 1807) – Hulked 1827
Mariya 74 ("Мария", 1808) – BU after 1818
Dmitrii Donskoi 74 ("Дмитрий Донской", 1807) – Discarded after 1818
Aziya 74 ("Азия", 1810) – BU 1825
Lesnoi (Lesnoye — "Лесной" or "Лесное") 74 (1811) – Hulked 1825
Maksim Ispovednik 74 ("Максим Исповедник", 1812) – BU 1832
Brien 74 ("Бриен", 1813) – Hulked 1826
Kul‘m 74 ("Кульм", 1813) – Hulked 1826
Krasnoi 74 ("Красной", 1816) – Hulked 1827
Nikolai 74 ("Николай", 1816) – Hulked 1827
Skoryi 74 ("Скорый", 1818) – BU after 1830

Poltava-class (3 units)

Poltava 110 ("Полтава", 1808) – Flagship of rear admiral Gavriil Sarychev in 1810 and vice-admiral Roman Gall in 1811 during Russo-Turkish War (1806–1812), BU 1832
Dvenadsat Apostolov 110 ("Двенадцать Апостолов", 1811) – BU 1832
Parizh 110 ("Париж", 1814) – Hulked 1827

Nord-Adler 74 ("Норд-Адлер", 1820) – BU 1839
Imperator Frants 110 ("Император Франц", 1821) – BU 1832
Pimen 74 ("Пимен", 1823) – Hulked 1839
Rarmen 74/89 ("Пармен", 1823) – Hulked 1835, BU 1842
Panteleimon 80 ("Пантелеймон", 1824) – Hulked 1838
Ioann Zlatoust 74/83 ("Иоанн Златоуст", 1825) – Hulked 1841
Derbent 110 ("Дербент", 1826) – Renamed Parizh ("Париж") 1827, Flagship of admiral Alexey Greig during Russo-Turkish War (1828–1829), hulked 1836, BU 1845

Imperatritsa Maria-class (3 units)

Imperatritsa Mariya 84/96 ("Императрица Мария", 1827) – Hulked 1843
Ches‘ma 84/91 ("Чесьма", 1828) – Hulked 1841
Anapa 84/108 ("Анапа", 1829) – Converted to harbour vessel 1845, BU 1850

Pamiat‘ Evstafiya 84/108 ("Память Евстафия", 1830) – Flagship of rear admiral Mikhail Lazarev at the Bosporus Expedition (1833), converted to harbour vessel 1845, BU 1850
Adrianopol‘ 84/108 ("Адрианополь", 1830) – Converted to harbour vessel 1845, BU 1850
Imperatritsa Ekaterina II 84/96 ("Императрица Екатерина II", 1831) – Converted to harbour vessel 1845, hulked 1847
Varshava 120 ("Варшава", 1833) – BU 1850
Silistriya 84/88 ("Силистрия", 1835) – Hulked 1852, scuttled to protect the harbour in 1854 during the Siege of Sevastopol

Sultan Makhmut-class (8 units)

 84 ("Султан Махмут", 1836) – Hulked 1852, BU 1854
 84 ("Трёх Иерархов", 1838) – BU 1854
 84 ("Гавриил", 1839) – Scuttled to protect the harbour in 1854 during the Siege of Sevastopol
 84 ("Селафаил", 1840) – Scuttled to protect the harbour in 1854 during the Siege of Sevastopol
 84 ("Уриил", 1840) – Scuttled to protect the harbour in 1854 during the Siege of Sevastopol
 84 ("Варна", 1842) – Scuttled to protect the harbour in 1854 during the Siege of Sevastopol
 84 ("Ягудиил", 1843) – Scuttled in 1855 at Sevastopol, when Russian troops abandoned the city
 84 ("Святослав", 1845) – Hospital ship 1854, scuttled to protect the harbour in 1855 during the Siege of Sevastopol

Tri Sviatitelia
Tri Sviatitelia 120/124 ("Три Святителя", 1838) – Scuttled to protect the harbour in 1854 during the Siege of Sevastopol

Dvenadsat Apostolov-class (3 units)

Dvenadsat Apostolov 120/124 ("Двенадцать Апостолов", 1841) – Scuttled to protect the harbour in 1855 during the Siege of Sevastopol
Parizh 120/124 ("Париж", 1849) – Scuttled in 1855 at Sevastopol, when Russian troops abandoned the city
Velikii Kniaz‘ Konstantin 120/124 ("Великий Князь Константин", 1852) – Scuttled in 1855 at Sevastopol, when Russian troops abandoned the city

Rostislav
 84 ("Ростислав", 1844) – Scuttled to protect the harbour in 1855 during the Siege of Sevastopol

Khrabryi-class (2 units)

 84 ("Храбрый", 1847) – Scuttled in 1855 at Sevastopol, when Russian troops abandoned the city
 84 ("Императрица Мария", 1853) – Flagship of admiral Pavel Nakhimov at the Battle of Sinop (1853), scuttled in 1855 at Sevastopol, when Russian troops abandoned the city

Chesma
 84 ("Чесьма", 1849) – Scuttled in 1855 at Sevastopol, when Russian troops abandoned the city

Tsearevitch
Tsesarevitch 135/115 ("Цесаревич", 1857) – Transferred to the Baltic Fleet 1858–59, converted to screw 1860, decommissioned 1874

Sinop
Sinop ("Синоп") (ex-Bosfor ("Босфор") – renamed on slip) 130 (1858) – Transferred to the Baltic Fleet 1858–59, converted to screw 1860, decommissioned 1874

Russian prizes (line-of-battle ships captured from opponents)
Vakhmeister 52 ("Вахмейстер", ex-Swedish HMS Wachtmeister 1681, captured in Battle of Osel Island 1719) – BU after 1728
Rodos 60 ("Родос", ex-Turkish ?, captured in Battle of Chesma 1770) – Wrecked 1770
Leontii Muchenik 64 ("Леонтий Мученик", ex-Turkish ?, captured near Ochakov (1788) during Russo-Turkish War (1787–1792)) – BU after 1791
Prints Gustav 70/74 ("Принц Густав", ex-Swedish HMS Prins Gustav 1758, captured in Battle of Hogland 1788) – Wrecked by Norwegian coast 1798
HMS Kronprins Gustav Adolf 62 (ex-Swedish 1782, captured near Sveaborg 1788) – Non commissioned and burnt by Russians 1788
Prints Karl 66 ("Принц Карл", ex-Swedish HMS Prins Carl 1758, captured in Battle of Reval 1790) – BU after 1813
Emgeiten 62/66 ("Эмгейтен", ex-Swedish HMS Ömheten 1783, captured in Battle of Vyborg Bay (1790)) – BU 1816
Retvizan 64/66 ("Ретвизан", ex-Swedish HMS Rättvisan 1783, captured in Battle of Vyborg Bay 1790) – Interned by Britain 1808, released 1813 and sold to Britain
Sofiya-Magdalina 74 ("София-Магдалина", ex-Swedish HMS Sofia Magdalena 1774, captured in Battle of Vyborg Bay 1790) – BU after 1805
Finland 60 ("Финланд", ex-Swedish HMS Finland 1735, captured in Battle of Vyborg Bay 1790) – Non commissioned and BU after 1794
Uppland 54 ("Уппланд", ex-Swedish HMS Uppland 1750, captured in Battle of Vyborg Bay 1790) – Non commissioned and sculpted 1790
Ioann Predtecha 78/66 ("Иоанн Предтеча", ex-Turkish Melek-i Bahri, captured in Battle of Tendra 1790) – Converted to floating battery in Sevastopol 1800
Leander 50 (ex-British Leander 1780, ex-Frehch 1798, captured during Corfu assault (1799) by Admiral Fyodor Ushakov's Russo-Turkish Squadron) – Returned to Britain 1800, hospital ship 1813, sold for BU 1817
Bechermer 44 (ex-Dutch, captured by British-Russian Squadron near Texel Island (1799) during the War of the Second Coalition) – Delivered to Britain 1799
Washington 70 (ex-Dutch, captured by British-Russian Squadron near Texel Island (1799) during the War of the Second Coalition) – Delivered to Britain 1799
Sedel‘ Bakhr 84 ("Седель Бахр", ex-Turkish Sadd al-Bahr, captured in Battle of Athos 1807) – Sold to France in Trieste 1809

Purchased foreign-built battleships (for the Baltic Fleet)
These were purchased around 1711-21. Name in brackets indicates place or country of purchase. It is difficult to trace some origins.
Sviatoi Antonii 50 ("Святой Антоний", Hamburg, ex-Don Antonio di Padua) – Purchased 1711, wrecked 1716
Randol‘f 50 ("Рандольф", England, ex-British Randolph) – Purchased 1712, BU 1725
Bulinbruk 52 ("Булинбрук", c. 1702, England, ex-British Sussex) – Captured by Sweden 1714 and returned to Britain
Oksford 50 ("Оксфорд", c. 1699, England, ex-Tankerfield) – Purchased 1712, sold in England 1717
Viktoriya 50 ("Виктория", c. 1706, England, ex-French Grand Vainqueur, (ex-French Gaillard)? ex-Dutch Overwinnaer, captured 1708) – Purchased 1712, BU after 1739
Straford 50 ("Страфорд", c. 1700, England, ex-Wintworth) – Purchased 1712, BU 1732
Fortuna 50 ("Фортуна", ex-British Fortune) – Purchased 1713, wrecked 1716
Armont 50 ("Армонт", ex-British) – Purchased 1713, BU 1747
Arondel‘ 50 ("Арондель", ex-British Arundel) – Purchased 1713, BU 1747
Perl 50 ("Перл", c. 1706/13, ex-Dutch Groote Perel) – Purchased 1713, BU after 1734
Leferm 70 ("Леферм", ex-British, purchased 1713, ex-French le Ferme, captured 1702) – Purchased 1713, BU 1737
London 54 ("Лондон", ex-British) – Purchased 1714, wrecked 1719
Britaniya 50 ("Британия", ex-British Great Allen) – Purchased 1714, converted to praam 1728
Portsmut 54 ("Портсмут". 1714, Dutch-built for Russia) – Purchased 1714, flagship of captain Naum Senyavin at the Battle of Osel Island (1719), wrecked 1719
Devonshir 52 ("Девоншир", 1714, Dutch-built for Russia) – Purchased 1714, BU after 1737
Marl‘burg 60 ("Марльбург", 1714, Dutch-built for Russia) – Purchased 1714, BU 1747
Prints Evgenii 50 ("Принц Евгений", 1721, Dutch-built for Russia) – Purchased 1721, BU after 1739
Nishtadt 56 ("Ништадт", 1721, Dutch-built for Russia, ex-Rotterdam) – Purchased 1721, wrecked 1721
anonymous 56 (c. 1710, ex-French Beau Parterre, ex-Dutch Schonauwen, captured 1711) – Captured by Sweden and renamed Kronskepp (never commissioned to the Russian Navy, known only by foreign sources)
Syurireis (=Surrey?) – Sold to Spain 1714 (as Real Macy 60)? (never commissioned to the Russian Navy, known only by foreign unreliable sources)

References
Veselago F. F. Spisok russkikh voyennykh sudov s 1668 po 1860 god. – Tipographia Morskogo Vedomstva, Saint Petersburg, 1872 (List of Russian naval ships from 1668 to 1860, in Russian)
Chernyshev A. A. Rossiyskiy parusnyi flot. Spravochnik. T. I. – Voyenizdat, Moskva, 1997 (Russian Sailing Fleet. Reference-book )
Boyevaya letopis' russkogo flota. Khronika vazhneishikh sobytii voyennoi istorii russkogo flota s IX veka po 1917 god. – Voyenizdat, Moskva, 1948. (Combat Annales of the Russian Navy. Chronicle of the Most Important Events of the Russian Navy History from the 9th Century up to 1917)
Information of Swedish warships by Jan-Erik Karlsson
Conway's All the World's Fighting Ships 1860–1905 – Conway Maritime Press
Naval Wars in the Baltic 1553–1850 (1910) – R. C. Anderson
Naval Wars in the Levant 1559–1853 (1952) – R. C. Anderson
Russian seapower and the Eastern question, 1827–41 (1991) – John C. K. Daly 
Mariner's Mirror (various issues)
Russian Warships in the Age of Sail, 1696–1860: Design, Construction, Careers and Fates. John Tredrea and Eduard Sozaev. Seaforth Publishing, 2010. .

Line
Russia

Russia